Könchek (died 1308) was Khan of the Chagatai Khanate (1307–1308). He was the son of Duwa. He converted to Islam around the same time as his father.

Upon his father's death, Könchek became Khan. His reign only lasted a year, before his death in 1308.

1308 deaths
Chagatai khans
14th-century monarchs in Asia
Year of birth unknown